Hosmer is a small Village near Fernie, and Sparwood, British Columbia, Canada.
It is situated near Mount Hosmer.

Hosmer was named after Charles R. Hosmer, railway official.

Local media

Newspapers

 Fernie Free Press - weekly paper
 Kootenay News Advertiser - weekly paper
 The Valley - weekly paper
 Fernie Fix - monthly glossy magazine

Radio stations

 99.1 FM - CJDR, a rebroadcaster of CHDR-FM, Rock
 92.7 FM - CFBZ, a rebroadcaster of CHBZ-FM, Country
 97.7 FM - CBTN, a rebroadcaster of CBTK-FM, CBC

Cable Television Stations

 Channel 10:  Shaw TV
 Channel 5:  CFCN, CTV
 Channel 13:  CBUT, CBC

See also
Fernie Ghostriders
Elk River
Elk Valley
Kootenay Ice

Populated places in the Regional District of East Kootenay
Designated places in British Columbia
Elk Valley (British Columbia)